Beatrix Suzetta Loughran (June 30, 1900 – December 7, 1975) was an American figure skater who competed in single and pair skating. She is the only American to win three Olympic medals in figure skating (1924, 1928, 1932), and one of the oldest figure skating Olympic medalists. She is a six-time national champion (1925–1927 in singles, 1930–1932 in pairs). Her pairs partner was Sherwin Badger.

Loughran was born in Mount Vernon, New York, and died in Long Beach, New York.
She was the aunt of three-time national medalist Audrey Peppe.

In 1997, Loughran was inducted into the United States Figure Skating Hall of Fame.

Results

Ladies' singles

Pairs
(with Badger)

References

1900 births
1975 deaths
American female single skaters
American female pair skaters
Figure skaters at the 1924 Winter Olympics
Figure skaters at the 1928 Winter Olympics
Figure skaters at the 1932 Winter Olympics
Olympic silver medalists for the United States in figure skating
Olympic bronze medalists for the United States in figure skating
Sportspeople from New York City
Olympic medalists in figure skating
World Figure Skating Championships medalists
Medalists at the 1924 Winter Olympics
Medalists at the 1928 Winter Olympics
Medalists at the 1932 Winter Olympics
20th-century American women
20th-century American people